Dahuashan Town is a town situated on the northwestern part of Pinggu District, Beijing, China. Its southern portion is an alluvial plain, and is surrounded by mountains on the other three directions. The town shares border with Jugezhuang and Dachengzi Towns to its north, Zhenluoying Town and Xiong'erzhai Township to its east, Wangxinzhuang Town to its south, as well as Liujiadian and Dongshaoqu Towns to its west. As of 2020, it had a population of 15,209. 

The name Dahuashan refers to the Dahua Mountain on the east of the town.

History

Administrative divisions 
By the end of 2021, Dahuashan Town was divided into these 20 villages:

Gallery

See also 

 List of township-level divisions of Beijing

References 

Pinggu District
Towns in Beijing